Sultaniya also spelled Soltaniyeh and Sultaniye, is a Perso-Arabic word meaning "belonging to Sultan". It may refer to:

Places
Soltaniyeh, capital of the Ilkhanate and a city in modern Iran
Soltaniyeh District, Iranian district in Abhar County, Zanjan Province
Soltaniyeh Rural District, Iranian rural district in Abhar County, Zanjan Province
Soltaniyeh, Hamadan, village in Malayer County, Hamadan Province, Iran
Soltaniyeh Hajjiabad, village in Sonqor County, Kermanshah Province, Iran
Al-Sultaniyah Madrasa, a religious, educational and funerary complex in Aleppo, Syria
Sultaniya, India, a village in  Rajasthan, India
As-Sultaniyah, a village in the Bint Jbeil District, in southern Lebanon
Sultaniye, Karacabey, Turkey
Sultaniye, Gümüşova